Ancient monument is a legal classification of historic sites in the United Kingdom. 

Ancient monument may also refer to:

Ancient monument (India)
Ancient monument (Thailand)
Ancient monuments of Java